Lugubrilaria is a genus of sea snails, marine gastropod mollusks in the family Fasciolariidae, the spindle snails, the tulip snails and their allies.

Species
Species within the genus Lugubrilaria include:
 Lugubrilaria badia (Krauss, 1848)
 Lugubrilaria lugubris (A. Adams & Reeve, 1847)
 Lugubrilaria seccombei Lyons, 2012

References

 Snyder M.A., Vermeij G.J. & Lyons W.G. (2012) The genera and biogeography of Fasciolariinae (Gastropoda, Neogastropoda, Fasciolariidae). Basteria 76(1-3): 31-70

Fasciolariidae